Emerald Airport  is an airport serving Emerald, a town located in the Central Highlands district of Queensland, Australia. The airport is operated by the Central Highlands Regional Council.

Emerald Airport is currently serviced by QantasLink, Virgin Australia Regional Airlines and Alliance Airlines who operate a 
combined (on average) 54 return commercial services to Brisbane per week.

Facilities 

Emerald Airport recently spent $7.7 million extending the terminal and refurbishing the old terminal. This was complete in the last quarter of 2010. This refurbishment, included security upgrades, improved amenities for passengers and a new flight status information system with displays throughout the airport and online.

In November 2014, work was completed on a $7.58 million upgrade to the Aircraft parking bays at the airport.

At the Australian Airport Association's 2021 National Airport Industry Awards, the airport was named Large Regional Airport of the Year.

Airlines and destinations

Statistics 
Emerald Airport was ranked 29th in Australia for the number of revenue passengers served in calendar year 2014.

See also 
 List of airports in Queensland

References 

Airports in Queensland
Buildings and structures in Central Queensland
Emerald, Queensland